The 2015–16 Botola 2 was the 54th season of Botola 2, the second division of the Moroccan football league. The season was started on the 5 September 2015 and  concluded the 15 May 2016. The season break was from 9 until 29 January 2016.

Team change

Teams relegated from 2014–15 Botola
 Ittihad Khemisset
 Chabab Atlas Khenifra

Teams promoted from 2014–15 GNFA 1
 Rachad Bernoussi
 Olympique Marrakech

Table 

Botola seasons